ÖHD may mean

 Özel Harekat Dairesi - Turkish police department overseeing the Police Special Operation Teams
 Özel Harp Dairesi - the Special Warfare Department, a department of the Turkish Army from 1965 to 1992

See also
OHD (disambiguation)